As it is a country with many different tribes and ethnic groups, the music of Indonesia itself is also very diverse, coming in hundreds of different forms and styles. Every region have its own culture and art, and as a result traditional music from area to area also uniquely differs from one another. For example, each traditional music are often accompanied by their very own dance and theatre. Contemporary music scene have also been heavily shaped by various foreign influences, such as America, Britain, Japan, Korea, and India. 
 
The music of Java, Sumatra, Bali, Flores (Lesser Sunda Islands) and other islands have been well documented and recorded,
and further research by Indonesian and international scholars is also ongoing. The music in Indonesia predates historical records, various Native Indonesian tribes often incorporate chants and songs accompanied with musical instruments in their rituals. The contemporary music of Indonesia today is also popular amongst neighbouring countries, such as Malaysia, Singapore and Brunei.

In general, traditional music and songs of Indonesia compromises a strong beat and harmony with strong influence from Indian and Malay classical music. The influence is strongly visible in the popular traditional music genre of Dangdut.

Musical instruments 

The musical identity of Indonesia as we know it today began as the Bronze Age culture migrated to the Indonesian archipelago in the 2nd-3rd century BC. Traditional musics of Indonesian tribes often uses percussion instruments, especially gongs and gendang (drums). Some of them developed elaborate and distinctive musical instruments, such as sasando string instrument of Rote island, angklung of Sundanese people, and the complex and sophisticated gamelan orchestra of Java and Bali.

Indonesia is the home of gong chime, gong chime is a generic term for a set of small, high-pitched bossed pot gongs. The gongs are ordinarily placed in order of pitch, with the boss upward on cords held in a low wooden frame. The frames can be rectangular or circular (the latter are sometimes called "gong circles"), and may have one or two rows of gongs. They are played by one to four musicians, each using two padded sticks to strike them. They are an important instrument in many Indonesian musical ensembles, such as gamelan, kulintang, and talempong.

Gamelan 

The most popular and famous form of Indonesian music is probably gamelan, an ensemble of tuned percussion instruments that include metallophones, drums, gongs and spike fiddles along with bamboo flutes. Similar ensembles are prevalent throughout Indonesia Singapore and Malaysia, however gamelan is originated from Java, Bali, and Lombok.

In the Central Java, gamelan is intricate and meticulously laid out. The central melody is played on a metallophone in the centre of the orchestra, while the front elaboration and ornamentation on the melody, and, at the back, the gongs slowly punctuate the music. There are two tuning systems. Each gamelan is tuned to itself, and the intervals between notes on the scale vary between ensembles. The metallophones cover four octaves, and include types like the slenthem, demung, saron panerus and balungan. The soul of the gamelan is believed to reside in the large gong, or gong ageng. Other gongs are tuned to each note of the scale and include ketuk, kenong and kempul. The front section of the orchestra is diverse, and includes rebab, suling, siter, bonang and gambang. Male choruses (gerong) and female (pesindhen) solo vocalists are common. With the arrival of the Dutch colonisers, a number system called kepatihan was developed to record the music. Music and dance at the time were divided into several styles based on the main courts in the area—Surakarta, Yogyakarta, Pakualaman and Mangkunegaran.

Gamelan from eastern Java is less well-known than central or western parts of the island. Perhaps most distinctive of the area is the extremely large gamyak drum. In West Java, formerly Sunda, has several types of gamelan. Gamelan Degung, gamelan salendro and tembang sunda are three primary types. The Osing Javanese minority in eastern Java are known for social music for weddings and other celebrations called gandrung, as well as angklung, played by young amateur boys, which is very similar to Balinese gamelan.

In Indonesia, gamelan often accompanies dance, wayang puppet performances, or rituals and ceremonies. Typically players in the gamelan will be familiar with dance moves and poetry, while dancers are able to play in the ensemble. In wayang, the dalang (puppeteer) must have a thorough knowledge of gamelan, as he gives the cues for the music. Gamelan can be performed by itself – in "klenengan" style, or for radio broadcasts – and concerts presentation are common in national arts conservatories founded in the middle of the 20th century.

 
Gamelan's role in rituals is so important that there is a Javanese saying, "It is not official until the gong is hung". Some performances are associated with royalty, such as visits by the sultan of Yogyakarta. Certain gamelans are associated with specific rituals, such as the Gamelan Sekaten, which is used in celebration of Mawlid an-Nabi (Muhammad's birthday). In Bali, almost all religious rituals include gamelan performance. Gamelan is also used in the ceremonies of the Catholic church in Indonesia. Certain pieces are designated for starting and ending performances or ceremonies. When an "ending" piece (such as "Udan Mas") is begun, the audience will know that the event is nearly finished and will begin to leave. Certain pieces are also believed to possess magic powers, and can be used to ward off evil spirits.

Talempong 

Talempong is a traditional instrument of the Minangkabau of West Sumatra. The shape is almost the same as the bonang instrument in the gamelan device. Talempongs can be made of brass, but some are made of wood and stone. Talempongs are played by being hit using a wooden rod or a stick. Talempong is usually used to accompany dance or welcoming performances, such as the typical Tari Piring, Tari Pasambahan, Tari Alang, Tari Suntiang Pangulu and Tari Gelombang. Talempong is usually performed with an accordion accompaniment, a type of organ supported and played with the right hand played by the player. In addition to the accordion, instruments such as saluang, gandang, serunai and other traditional Minangkabau instruments are also commonly played with talempong.

Kulintang 

Kolintang or kulintang is a bronze and wooden percussion instrument native to eastern Indonesia and also The Philippines. In Indonesia it is particularly associated with Minahasa people of North Sulawesi, however it also popular in Maluku and Timor. The instrument consist of a row/set of 5 to 9 graduated pot gongs, horizontally laid upon a frame arranged in order of pitch with the lowest gong found on the players' left. The gongs are laid in the instrument face side up atop two cords/strings running parallel to the entire length of the frame, with bamboo/wooden sticks/bars resting perpendicular across the frame, creating an entire kulintang set called a "pasangan".

The main purpose for kulintang music in the community is to function as social entertainment at a professional, folk level. This music is unique in that it is considered a public music in the sense everyone is allowed to participate. Not only do the players play, but audience members are also expected to participate. These performances are important in that they bring people in the community and adjacent regions together, helping unify communities that otherwise may not have interacted with one another. Traditionally, when performers play kulintang music, their participation is voluntary. Musicians see performances as an opportunity to receive recognition, prestige and respect from the community and nothing more. 
kulintang music differs in many aspects from gamelan music, primarily in the way the latter constructs melodies within a framework of skeletal tones and prescribed time interval of entry for each instruments. The framework of kulintang music is more flexible and time intervals are nonexistent, allowing for such things as improvisations to be more prevalent.

Angklung 

Angklung is a bamboo musical instrument native to Sundanese people of West Java. It is made out of bamboo tubes attached to a bamboo frame. The tubes are carved so that they have a distinctive resonant pitch when being vibrated. Each angklung only plays one note. 
This musical instrument made of bamboo is played by shaking it. The sound of the Angklung is generated from the impact of bamboo tubes. It has a distinctive sound that vibrates in a composition of 2, 3, to 4 notes in each size.

Angklung existed before the Hindu era in Indonesia. In the days of the Sundanese kingdom (12th to 16th centuries), Angklung became a musical instrument that was always used in various events or celebrations, especially traditional events in farming. At that time, Angklung was played as worship of "Dewi Sri", namely the Goddess of Rice or the Goddess of Fertility to be given blessings to the plants she planted and also to prosper in life. Not only that, during the Sundanese kingdom, Angklung was also used as a trigger for the spirit of war.

The types of bamboo that are commonly used as musical instruments are black bamboo (awi wulung) and ater bamboo (awi temen), which when dry are whitish yellow. Each note (barrel) is produced from the sound of the bamboo tube in the form of a blade (wilahan) for each bamboo segment from small to large. Each bamboo size has a different pitch. UNESCO designated the angklung a Masterpiece of the Oral and Intangible Heritage of Humanity on 18 November 2010.

Suling 

Suling is the Sundanese word for seruling the word of Indonesian, which means 'flute'. Made from bamboo, Indonesian flutes are always end blown and vary in size. The fingering position changes the wavelength of sound resonance inside the suling's body. Depending on the distance of nearest hole to the suling's head, different notes can be produced. The airflow speed also can modify the tone's frequency. A note with twice frequency can be produced mostly by blowing the air into suling's head's hole with twice speed. Generally, the shorter the suling the higher the pitch. This simple suling produces tunes or melodies that have traditionally been interpreted as the sound of joyful learning. There are many regions in Indonesia that use suling as a traditional instrument and have different local names for it. In Java, Sunda, and Bali, this instrument is commonly called suling, in Minang it is called saluang, in Toraja, it is called Lembang flute, in Halmahera, it is called bangsil, and in West Nusa Tenggara it is called silu. Suling is an Indonesian bamboo ring flute which is used in various traditional musical ensemble performances, including gamelan, gambus, and dangdut. This flute is made of a long, thin-walled bamboo tube called tamiang and a thin rattan band encircles the mouthpiece.

Kacapi suling 

Kacapi suling is a type of instrumental music that is highly improvisational and popular in parts of West Java that employs two instruments, kacapi (zither) and suling (bamboo flute). It is related to tembang sunda. The rhythmic strains of the kecapi are slow in tempo, produced by strings that blend into soft music when combined with the melody of the suling or melismatic vocals. The kacapi is a traditional zither of Sundanese musical instrument derived from the Chinese , and similar to the Japanese koto, the Mongolian , the Korean , the Vietnamese  and the Kazakh jetigen, and suling is a bamboo flute.

Kendang 

Kendang or Gendang is a two-headed drum used by peoples from Indonesian archipelago. Among the Javanese, Sundanese, or Balinese peoples, the kendang has one side larger than the other, with the larger, lower-pitched side usually placed to the right, and are usually placed on stands horizontally and hit with the hands on either side while seated on the floor. Amongst groups like the Balinese both sides are of equal size, and are played on either one or both sides using a combination of hands and/or sticks. Among the Makassarese, the Ganrang drums have much more importance, with it considered the most sacred of all musical instruments, comparable to gongs in Java.

One of the best known variations of the Kendang is the Gendang beleq. Gendang beleq is a traditional music from Lombok island, Indonesia. The name gendang beleq is a Sasak language term, which means "big drum (big gendang)", as the performance is about a group of musicians playing, dancing and marching with their traditional instruments, centered on two big drum (gendang). The drum is made from a wood frame with goat skin drum-head. The wood is selected from woods which is hard yet light. In a Gendang beleq performance, the drummers carry and play gendang and dance a dramatic and confrontational duet. The drummers play interlocking tune with their large drums. Aside from able to play their instruments, the players must have the agility and stamina to perform the dance and marching with their instrument.

Sasando 

Sasando is a plucked string instrument native of Rote island of East Nusa Tenggara. The parts of sasando are a bamboo cylinder surrounded by several wedges where the strings are stretched, surrounded by a bag-like fan of dried lontar or palmyra leaves (Borassus flabellifer), functioned as the resonator of the instrument.

Tapanuli ogong 

Musical performance from Tapanuli area of North Sumatra. Tapanuli ogong is a form of dance music played with a type of lute, trumpet and flute.

Sape Dayak 

The sape' (sampek, sambe', sapek) is a traditional lute of the Kenyah and Kayan community who live in the longhouses that line the rivers of East Kalimantan, West Kalimantan and North Kalimantan. Sape' are carved from a single bole of wood, with many modern instruments reaching over a metre in length. Technically, the sape is a relatively simple instrument, with one string carrying the melody and the accompanying strings as rhythmic drones. In practice, the music is quite complex, with many ornamentations and thematic variations.

Genres 

The diverse world of Indonesian music genres was the result of the musical creativity of its people, and also the subsequent cultural encounters with foreign musical influences into the archipelago. Next to distinctive native form of musics, several genres can traces its origin to foreign influences; such as gambus and qasidah from Middle Eastern Islamic music, keroncong from Portuguese influences, and dangdut with notable Hindi music influence.

Folk music 

Indonesian regional folk pop musics reflects the diversity of Indonesian culture and Indonesian ethnicity, mostly use local languages and a mix of western and regional style music and instruments. Indonesian folk music is quite diverse, and today embraces pop, rock, house, hip hop and other genres, as well as distinct Indonesian forms. There are several kinds of "ethnic" pop music, generally grouped together as Pop Daerah (regional pop). These include Pop sunda, Pop Minang, Pop Batak, Pop Melayu, Pop Ambon, Pop Minahasa and others. Other than featuring the legacy of Lagu Daerah (regional traditional songs) of each regional cultures, the musician might also create some new compositions in their own native language.

Tembang Sunda 
Tembang sunda, also called "seni mamaos cianjuran", or just cianjuran, is a form of sung poetry which arose in the colonial-era of Cianjur. It was first known as an aristocratic art; one cianjuran composer was R.A.A. Kusumahningrat (Dalem Pancaniti), ruler of Cianjur (1834–1862). The instruments of Cianjuran are kacapi indung, kacapi rincik and suling or bamboo flute, and rebab for salendro compositions. The lyrics are typically sung in free verse, but a more modern version, panambih, is metrical. It is usually the drums.

Jaipongan 

Jaipongan is a very complex rhythmic dance music from the Sundanese people of western Java. The rhythm is liable to change seemingly randomly, making dancing difficult for most listeners. Its instruments are entirely Sundanese, completely without imported instruments. It was invented by artists like Gugum Gumbira after Sukarno prohibited rock and roll and other western genres in the 1960s.

Gambus 
Gambus literally means oud, referring to a type of lute or 12-string pear-shaped guitar, is the Middle-Eastern-derived Islamic vocal and instrumental music. These traditions began to be incorporated throughout many areas of Indonesia by the 16th century.

Qasidah modern 
Qasidah is an ancient Arabic word for religious poetry accompanied by chanting and percussion. Qasidah modern adapts this for pop audiences. It is used to denote a type of orchestra and the music it plays, believed to be introduced by Muslim settlers from Yemen. Qasidah modern were derived from Islamic pop, adding local dialects and lyrics that address Indonesian contemporary issues. Though popular among Arabs in Indonesia, it has gained little popularity elsewhere. One of the oldest qasidah modern musical groups in Indonesia is Nasida Ria.

The contemporary form of Islamic Middle Eastern-influenced music in Indonesia is exemplified by the band Debu, that feature a sufism approach on music to spread their message.

Kroncong 

Kroncong (alternative spelling: Keroncong) has been evolving since the arrival of the Portuguese, who brought with them European instruments. By the early 1900s, it was considered a low-class urban music. This changed in the 1930s, when the rising Indonesian film industry began incorporating kroncong. And then even more so in the mid- to late 1940s, it became associated with the struggle for independence.

Perhaps the most famous song in the kroncong style is "Bengawan Solo", written in 1940 by Gesang Martohartono, a Solonese musician. Written during the Japanese Imperial Army occupation of the island in World War II, the song (about the Bengawan Solo River, Java's longest and most important river) became widely popular among the Javanese, and then later nationally when recordings were broadcast over the local radio stations. The song also became quite popular with the Japanese soldiers, and when they returned to Japan at the end of the war re-recordings of it (by Japanese artists) became best-sellers. Over the years it has been re-released many times by notable artists, mainly within Asia but also beyond (like Anneke Grönloh), and in some places it is seen as typifying Indonesian music. Gesang himself remains the most renowned exponent of the style, which although it is seen now as a somewhat starchy and "dated" form is still popular among large segments of the population, particularly the older generation.

After World War II and during Indonesian National Revolution (1945–1949) and afterwards, kroncong was associated with patriotism, since many of Indonesian poets and patriotic songs authors uses kroncong and somewhat jazz fusion as the genre of their works. The patriotic theme and romantic wartime romance was obvious in the works of Ismail Marzuki, such as "Rayuan Pulau Kelapa", "Indonesia Pusaka", "Sepasang Mata Bola", "Keroncong Serenata" and "Juwita Malam". These patriotic songs can be sung in hymn or even in orchestra, but most often was sung in kroncong style known as kroncong perjuangan (struggle kroncong). The kroncong divas; Waldjinah, Sundari Sukoco and Hetty Koes Endang, was instrumental in reviving the style in the 1980s.

Langgam Jawa 
There is a style of kroncong native to Surakarta (Solo) called langgam jawa, which fuses kroncong with the gamelan seven-note scale.

Gambang kromong 

Early in the 20th century, kroncong was used in a type of theatre called Komedi Stambul; adapted for this purpose, the music was called gambang kromong. Gambang kromong is quite prevalent in Betawi culture of Jakarta.

Tanjidor 
Tanjidor is a traditional Betawi musical ensemble of Jakarta. The instruments used are almost the same as a military marching band and/or corps of drums/drum and bugle corps, usually consists of tuba or sousaphone, trumpet, clarinet, tambourine and drums. The term tanjidor was derived from Portuguese tanger (playing music) and tangedor (playing music outdoors), subsequently adopted in Betawi language as tanji (music). Other than Jakarta, tanjidor musical ensamble is also can be found in Pontianak, West Kalimantan.

Campursari 

A musical fusion style of traditional Javanese music and dangdut that prevalent in Javanese cultural sphere, mainly Central Java, Yogyakarta and East Java, Perhaps its greatest current artist is Didi Kempot. In the western part of Java, the Sundanese Dangdut or Campursari version of the Sundanese was born and developed from traditional Jaipong music with a distinctive drum beat.

Dangdut 

Dangdut is a popular traditional music genre of Indonesia which is partly derived of Indian, Arab, and Malay music. It consists of melodious and harmonical music with the main Tabla as the percussion beat especially in the classical dangdut versions. It was originally an Indonesian dance music that has spread throughout Southeast Asia, became the dominant pop style in the mid-1970s. Famous for its throbbing beat and the slightly moralistic lyrics that appeal to youth, dangdut stars dominate the modern pop scene. However dangdut—especially performed by female singers—also often featuring suggestive dance movements and naughty lyrics to appeal the larger audience. This development was strongly opposed by the conservative older generation dangdut artist.

Dangdut is based around the singers, and stars include Rhoma Irama and Elvy Sukaesih (the King and Queen of Dangdut), Mansyur S., A. Rafiq, Camelia Malik and Fahmy Shahab; along with Cici Paramida, Evie Tamala, Inul Daratista, Julia Perez and Dewi Perssik from younger generation.

Contemporary music 
The contemporary music of Indonesia is diverse and vibrant. Throughout its history, Indonesian musicians were open to foreign influences of various music genres of the world. American jazz was heavily marketed in Asia, and foxtrots, tangos, rumbas, blues and Hawaiian guitar styles were all imitated by Indonesian musicians. As the result, various genres were developed within Indonesian music frame: Indonesian pop, rock, jazz, and hip hop.

Indonesian music also plays a vital role in the Indonesian creative pop culture, especially as the soundtracks or theme songs of Indonesian cinema and sinetrons (Indonesian TV drama). Indonesian film Badai Pasti Berlalu (1977) were also produced successful soundtrack hit with same title in the same year, the soundtrack was remade in 1999 with Chrisye as the main singer and rendered by Erwin Gutawa in orchestra style. In 2007 the film was remade again with a new soundtrack that still features same songs performed by younger generation artist. Another popular Indonesian coming of age teen movie Ada Apa Dengan Cinta (2002) also produced successful soundtrack hits with most songs written and performed by Melly Goeslaw.

Today the Indonesian music industry enjoys nationwide popularity. Thanks to common culture and intelligible languages between Indonesian and Malay, Indonesian music enjoyed regional popularity in neighbouring countries such as Malaysia, Singapore and Brunei. However, the overwhelming popularity of Indonesian music in Malaysia had alarmed the Malaysian music industry. In 2008 Malaysian music industry demanded the restriction of Indonesian songs on Malaysian radio broadcasts.

Orchestra 
Western classical music reached Indonesia in the era of Dutch East Indies as early as the 18th century, but it was enjoyed only by a handful of wealthy Dutch plantation owners and officers in elite social clubs and ballrooms such as Societeit Harmonie in Batavia and Societeit Concordia in Bandung. De Schouwburg van Batavia (today Gedung Kesenian Jakarta) was designed as a concert hall in the 19th century. Classical music has been restricted to the refined, wealthy and educated high-class citizen, and never penetrated the rest of the population during the East Indies colonial era. The type of western-derived music that transcended the social barrier at that time was Kroncong, known as lower-class music.

An amateur group called Bataviasche Philharmonic Orchestra was established in Dutch colonial times. It became the NIROM orchestra when the radio broadcasting station Nederlandsch-Indische Radio Omroep Maatschappij was born in 1912. Today it is known as Jakarta Symphony Orchestra that has existed in the country's musical world for almost a century through its changing formats to suit prevailing trends and needs. In 1950, a merger of the Cosmopolitan Orchestra under Joel Cleber and the Jakarta Studio Orchestra under Sutedjo and Iskandar appeared as the Djakarta Radio Orchestra under Henkie Strake for classical repertoires, and the Jakarta Studio Orchestra led by Syaiful Bachri specialised in Indonesian pieces. In 2010 Jakarta Symphony Orchestra staged a comeback after a fairly long absence.

In the 1960s to 1980s classical music in Indonesia aired mainly by the national radio broadcasting service Radio Republik Indonesia (RRI) and the national TV station Televisi Republik Indonesia (TVRI) through their programs. During these decades, the classical orchestra mainly developed in Universities as an extracurricular activity for students which included choir. In the 1990s the group of professional symphony orchestra start to take form, notably The Twilite Orchestra led by Adie MS, was founded in June 1991, initially an ensemble with 20 musicians. The ensemble has developed since then into a full symphonic orchestra with 70 musicians, a 63-member Twilite Chorus, and a repertoire that ranges from Beethoven to The Beatles. The orchestra has played a role in promoting Indonesian music, especially in the preservation of national songs by Indonesian composers and traditional songs. Aided by the Victorian Philharmonic Orchestra with the Twilite Chorus, Addie MS re-recorded the Indonesian national anthem, Indonesia Raya, by WR Supratman in its original orchestral arrangement by Jos Cleber, as well as other Indonesian popular national songs in the album Simfoni Negeriku.

The Indonesian composer who is considered most prominent and well known worldwide in the classical / contemporary music is Ananda Sukarlan (born 1968), with many orchestral works, chamber and instrumental. His most celebrated works are a series of virtuosic Rapsodia Nusantara for piano solo, with musical motifs based on Indonesian folktunes. He has written works for musicians such as from the Boston Symphony Orchestra, violinist Midori Goto etc., and his works are widely performed worldwide

Today, major cities like Jakarta, Bandung, Yogyakarta, Surabaya, Medan and Batam are no strangers to orchestral music, with their own symphony groups. Jakarta, for instance, has its Nusantara Symphony Orchestra, the Twilite Orchestra and the Jakarta Chamber Orchestra.

Indonesia also has many patriotic songs that are used, played, and memorized by the population, some of these national songs are used during the colonial era of the Dutch East Indies, Japanese Occupation, and today Indonesia. Many of these songs have been recorded using orchestral recordings on different albums such as 'Simfoni Negeriku' conducted by Addie MS.

Pop 

Indonesian pop music today, known simply as "pop Indonesia" sometimes influenced by trends and recordings from West music,. Although influences ranging from American pop, British pop, and also Asian J-pop are obvious, the Indonesian pop phenomena is not completely derivative; it expresses the sentiments and styles of contemporary Indonesian life.

Koes Bersaudara later formed as Koes Plus is considered one of the pioneers of Indonesian pop and rock and roll music in the 1960s and 1970s. The American and British music influences were obvious in the music of Koes Bersaudara, The Beatles were known to be the main influences of this band. Several Indonesian musician were survived through decades and become Indonesian music legends, such as pop and ballad singers Iwan Fals and Chrisye; rock legend God Bless, Panbers, and D'Lloyd; dangdut maestro Rhoma Irama. One of the most influential Indonesian singers in pop music scene, especially during early 2000, is Agnes Monica, who had later known as Agnez Mo.

In late 90s through 2000s, the popular bands include Slank, Dewa 19, Peterpan, Gigi, Sheila on 7, Jamrud, Padi, Ungu, Radja, Letto, D'Masiv and Nidji, all of which tour regularly in Indonesia, Singapore and Malaysia and was featured on MTV Asia.

Some of Indonesian pop bands are rekindled with their Malay roots and revived a genre called "Band Pop Melayu" (Pop Malay Band) and popular in the late 2000s. The pop Malay bands include Kangen Band, WALI, Hijau Daun, Armada, Angkasa and ST 12.

Indonesian pop music from the 1980s and 1980 are commonly referred to as "Indonesian city pop", due to their perceived similarities to the Japanese genre. The Japanese city pop itself gained popularity among youngsters and amateur musicians in the late 2010s via the Internet.

The most recent foreign influences on Indonesian pop music are influenced from Japanese pop. Several bands such as J-Rocks emulate Japanese pop culture. Girl groups are also spreading among boy bands, such as 7icons and Cherrybelle, as well as JKT48 which is an offshoot of the Japanese AKB48.

Rock 

Just like pop music, Indonesian rock scene also was heavily influenced by the development of rock music in America. The most influential Indonesian rock bands was probably Panbers and God Bless that was popular in the 1970s and 1980s. In the late 1980s to mid-1990s several female rock singers popularly known as "Lady Rockers" were famous in Indonesia, such as Nicky Astria, Nike Ardilla, and Anggun who started her career in as a pop-rock singer in Indonesia before moving to France and pursue her international career. Other notable rock bands include Slank and Jamrud. Metal bands also exist, such as the metalcore band Killing Me Inside, Death Metal / Grindcore band Jasad and the Groove Metal  / Metalcore band Burgerkill. Punk music scene also had steady underground success, with band like Pee Wee Gaskins, Superman Is Dead, and Netral rose to mainstream. Notable act from ska music is Tipe-X.

Jazz fusion 
Some of Indonesian musicians and bands were exploring the jazz music. Notable Indonesian jazz musicians include Jack Lesmana, Benny Likumahuwa, Benny Mustafa, Maryono, Bubi Chen Maliq & D'Essentials. Various other groups fuse contemporary westernised jazz fusion music with the traditional ethnic music traditions of their hometown. In the case of Krakatau and SambaSunda, the bands from West Java, the traditional Sundanese kacapi suling and gamelan orchestra is performed alongside drum set, keyboard and guitars. The Jakarta International Java Jazz Festival is performed annually. The latest development of Jazz in Indonesia reflected with many Jazz Festivals being held every year.

Indie scene 
By the end of the 2000s decade, several indie bands such as Mocca, White Shoes & the Couples Company, and Efek Rumah Kaca emerged into the mainstream, providing soundtracks for film and subsequent tours in overseas territories. Upon entering the new decade (2010s), indie music broke into mainstream culture with its far greater appeal amongst adolescents due to its minimalist, melancholic sounds and age-related lyrics. The commercial breakthrough for its genre was led by Payung Teduh, Fourtwenty, Stars and Rabbit, Danilla, Banda Neira, Barasuara, and Fiersa Besari.

Notable contemporary artists
 Agnez Mo
 Benyamin Sueb
 Bing Slamet 
 Brian Immanuel (Rich Brian)
 Chrisye
 Ebiet G. Ade
 Fariz RM
 Gesang
 Gombloh
 Guruh Sukarnoputra
 Harry Roesli (1950s–1970s) 
 Iwan Fals
 Nicole Zefanya (Niki)
 Titiek Puspa
 Wighar
 The Tielman Brothers, Eurasians originally from Indonesia who gained popularity in Europe. Their style is called Indorock, after the colonial term used for Eurasians: Indo-European, shortened to Indo.
 Rainych
 Stephanie Poetri

See also 

 Anugerah Musik Indonesia
 Indo pop
 Indonesian rock
 List of Indonesian musicians and musical groups
 List of Indonesian composers
 List of Indonesian rock bands
 List of Indonesian pop musicians
 Culture of Indonesia
 Music of Sunda
 Music of Java
 Music of Bali
 Music of Sumatra
 Indonesian popular music recordings
 Indonesian hip hop
 Rock music
 Pop music
Jengglong

References

Sources 
 Bass, Colin. "No Risk -- No Fun!". 2000. In Broughton, Simon and Ellingham, Mark with McConnachie, James and Duane, Orla (Ed.), World Music, Vol. 2: Latin & North America, Caribbean, India, Asia and Pacific, pp 131–142. Rough Guides Ltd, Penguin Books. 
 Heaton, Jenny and Steptoe, Simon. "A Storm of Bronze". 2000. In Broughton, Simon and Ellingham, Mark with McConnachie, James and Duane, Orla (Ed.), World Music, Vol. 2: Latin & North America, Caribbean, India, Asia and Pacific, pp 117–130. Rough Guides Ltd, Penguin Books.

External links 
 Music of Indonesia Series of 20 CDs by Smithsonian Folkways
  Audio clips: Traditional music of Indonesia. Musée d'ethnographie de Genève. Accessed 25 November 2010.
 BBC TV channel 3 Audio (60 minutes): Music of Bali. Accessed 25 November 2010.
 BBC Radio 3 Audio (60 minutes): Java, Jakarta to Solo. Accessed 25 November 2010.
 The traditional music of Indonesia
 Indonesian Fusion
 Various Types Of Indonesian Musical Instruments
 Listening to Balinese Gamelan: A Beginners' Guide from Connexions accessed 20/01/2012